Pilsbryspira garciacubasi is a species of sea snail, a marine gastropod mollusk in the family Pseudomelatomidae, the turrids and allies.

Description
The length of the shell varies between 10 mm and 15 mm.

Distribution
This species occurs in the Pacific Ocean between Mexico and Panama

References

 Shasky, D.R. (1971) Ten new species of tropical Eastern Pacific Turridae. The Veliger, 14, 67–72, 1 pl.

External links
 
 Gastropods.com: Pilsbryspira garciacubasi

garciacubasi
Gastropods described in 1971